7-a-side football at the 2008 Summer Paralympics was held at the Olympic Green Hockey Field from September 8 to September 16. One event was contested, a men's team competition.

Classification
The sport of 7-a-side football is for people with cerebral palsy; athletes classified as CP5 through CP8 may take part. The classification system grades player by the extent of their disability, with lower numbers corresponding to more severe impairment. At least one CP5 or CP6 player, and no more than three CP8 players, may be on the field at a given time.

Participating teams
Eight teams qualified for the football 7-a-side tournament in the 2008 Summer Paralympics.

Competition format
The eight teams were divided into two even groups for a single round robin group stage. The top two teams of each group qualified for the semifinal, while the lower two teams from each group competed for 5th through 8th places. Games consisted of two 30-minute halves. A victory ceremony was held just after the finish of the gold medal match, at 18:00 on September 16.

Group stage

Group A

Group B

Knockout stage

Classification round

5th–8th place semi-finals

7th–8th place match

5th–6th place match

Medal round

Semifinal

Bronze medal match

Gold medal match

Medallists

References

External links
Official site of the 2008 Summer Paralympics
IPC
CPISRA

 
2008
2008 Summer Paralympics events
Paralympics